Marnie Stern is the third album by Marnie Stern, released on October 5, 2010 on Kill Rock Stars. The first single, "For Ash" was released July 26, 2010.

Track listing
 "For Ash" - 4:27
 "Nothing Left" - 2:57
 "Transparency Is the New Mystery" - 2:56
 "Risky Biz" - 3:16
 "Female Guitar Players Are the New Black" - 3:12
 "Gimme" - 4:11
 "Cinco de Mayo" - 3:16
 "Building a Body" - 3:02
 "Her Confidence" - 3:08
 "The Things You Notice" - 3:33

Personnel
 Marnie Stern: vocals, guitar, keyboards
 Matthew Flegel: bass, keyboards, organ
 Lars Stalfors: keyboards
 Zach Hill: drums, bass, keyboards, piano

References

2010 albums
Marnie Stern albums
Kill Rock Stars albums